

Ion Ignatiuc (15 February 1893, Prepeliţa - 23 January 1943) was a Bessarabian politician.

Biography 

He served as Member of the Moldovan Parliament (1917–1918).

Gallery

Bibliography 
Gheorghe E. Cojocaru, Sfatul Țării: itinerar, Civitas, Chişinău, 1998, 
Mihai Taşcă, Sfatul Țării şi actualele autorităţi locale, "Timpul de dimineaţă", no. 114 (849), June 27, 2008 (page 16)

External links 
 Arhiva pentru Sfatul Tarii
 Deputaţii Sfatului Ţării şi Lavrenti Beria
 http://www.literaturasiarta.md/pressview.php?l=ro&idc=104&id=1030&zidc=4
 http://www.universulromanesc.org/biblio/rechizitoriu-c-ionitoiu/107-gsc-00-genocidul-din-romania/111-macelul-de-la-fantana-alba-rechizitoriu-cicerone-ionitoiu-007.html

Notes

1893 births
1943 deaths
People from Sîngerei District
Moldovan MPs 1917–1918